The Chemainus station is located in Chemainus, British Columbia.  The station was a flag stop on Via Rail's Dayliner service. The station closed in 2011 due to poor track conditions.

Footnotes

External links 
Via Rail Station Description

Via Rail stations in British Columbia
Railway stations closed in 2011
Disused railway stations in Canada